Serica georgiana is a species of scarab beetles in the family Scarabaeidae. It is found in North America.

Subspecies
 S. georgiana georgiana Leng, 1911
 S. georgiana lecontei Dawson, 1921

References

 Evans, Arthur V. (2003). "A checklist of the New World chafers (Coleoptera: Scarabaeidae: Melolonthinae)".

Further reading

 Arnett, R.H. Jr., M. C. Thomas, P. E. Skelley and J. H. Frank. (eds.). (2002). American Beetles, Volume II: Polyphaga: Scarabaeoidea through Curculionoidea. CRC Press LLC, Boca Raton, FL.
 Arnett, Ross H. (2000). American Insects: A Handbook of the Insects of America North of Mexico. CRC Press.
 Richard E. White. (1983). Peterson Field Guides: Beetles. Houghton Mifflin Company.

Melolonthinae